Richard Sydenham (born: 23 February 1976) is a sailor from Exeter, Great Britain. who represented his country at the 2000 Summer Olympics in Sydney, Australia as crew member in the Soling. With helmsman Andy Beadsworth and fellow crew member Barry Parkin they took the 12th place.

References

Living people
1976 births
Sailors at the 2000 Summer Olympics – Soling
Olympic sailors of Great Britain
Sportspeople from Exeter
British male sailors (sport)